Ainsley Bennett  (born July 22, 1954, in St Catherine, Jamaica) is a British former Olympic and World Championship sprinter from Birmingham, UK.

Early life
Brought up in Birmingham, West Midlands, in the UK, Bennett attended Naseby Secondary Modern School (The school changed its name to Park View in the 1980s, and remains so to this date), in the area known as Alum Rock, Birmingham. This school coincidentally also produced a Republic of Ireland International cross-country runner, Paul O'Callaghan, who competed in six World Cross Country Running Championships, qualified for the Olympics (although injury prevented him from taking part) and wore the green of Éire from 1982 to 2003 in road, track and cross country races.

Athletics career
Ainsley competed for Birchfield Harriers Athletics Club, based in Perry Barr in North Birmingham, and represented Great Britain at the 1976 Olympic Games held in Montreal, Canada, where he reached the semi-finals of the men's 200m sprint race, as well as being one of the men's 4 × 400 m relay team which unfortunately failed to progress further than the first heats.

However, Bennett fared better in the 4 x 400 metres relay at the 1983 World Championships in Athletics in Helsinki, where he and teammates Garry Cook, Todd Bennett and Philip Brown took the bronze medal in a time of 3:03.53, finishing behind the Soviet Union and West Germany.

Career personal bests
100m - 10.21 (1979)
200m - 20.42 (1979)
400m - 46.15 (1975)

Current activity
After finishing his athletics career Ainsley founded a successful events management and corporate hospitality business, Ainsley Bennett Associates, using his contacts to specialise in tickets to hard-to-find and VIP events and although he no longer runs competitively, Ainsley is a Trustee for Birchfield Harriers.

He and his partner, Mary Sharp, now live in Hampton-in-Arden with their two children: Callum and Ruaidhri Bennett.

References
 http://www.olympics.org.uk/athleterecord.aspx?at=457
 https://web.archive.org/web/20100531034235/http://www.flotrack.org/articles/view/351-paul-ocallaghan-aspire-running
 
 http://www.sportinglife.com/athletics/worldathletics2005/news/story_get.cgi?STORY_NAME=others/05/07/15/ATHLETICS_World_Medals.html

1954 births
Living people
Jamaican emigrants to the United Kingdom
British male sprinters
Olympic athletes of Great Britain
Birchfield Harriers
World Athletics Championships athletes for Great Britain
World Athletics Championships medalists
Athletes (track and field) at the 1976 Summer Olympics
Universiade medalists in athletics (track and field)
Universiade bronze medalists for Great Britain
Medalists at the 1979 Summer Universiade